The tennis career of Serena Williams began in 1995, but she did not compete in 1996. She continued through the 1997 season and ended in the top 20 in 1998.

Years Summary

1995–1996
Williams's first professional event was in October 1995, at the age of 14, at the Bell Challenge in Quebec City. She lost in the first round of qualifying to world no. 149 Annie Miller in less than an hour of play and earned US$240 in prize money.

Williams did not play a tournament in 1996.

1997
Williams played the qualifying rounds of her first three tournaments of 1997, in the first round of State Farm Evert Cup, third round of Acura Classic and second round of European Indoor Championships, to Alexia Dechaume-Balleret, Magui Serna and Dominique Monami respectively. She then qualified for her first tour main draw when she defeated Magui Serna in the final round of qualifying at the Kremlin Cup, but lost in the first round of the main draw to compatriot Kimberly Po. She then entered the Ameritech Cup as a wild card and ranked no. 304. She earned her first main draw win against then world no. 27 Elena Likhovtseva in straight sets. In the next round, she upset world no. 7 Mary Pierce in two tight sets, with Williams failing to serve it out in the twelfth game of the second set but eventually won in a tie-break. In the quarterfinal she upset world no. 4 Monica Seles easing through the second and third sets, recording her first career wins over top 10 players and becoming the lowest-ranked player in the open era to defeat two top 10 opponents in one tournament. She ultimately lost in the semifinals to world no. 5 Lindsay Davenport 4-6 in both sets.

In doubles, she paired with sister Venus Williams in three events, reaching the quarterfinals of State Farm Evert Cup losing to third seeds Lindsay Davenport and Natasha Zvereva easily and the semifinals of the Ameritech Cup withdrawing before their match against compatriots Lindsay Davenport and Monica Seles.

1998

Adidas International
Williams began her 1998 by entering the qualifying draw of the Adidas International. Williams qualified by defeating the 64th ranked Laura Golarsa in the final round losing just two games. In the main draw was made to work in three sets against Mirjana Lučić coming from a set down to advance. She then faced Frenchwoman Sandrine Testud and was a set and 3-0 up when her opponent retired. In the quarterfinals, Williams took on world no. 3 Lindsay Davenport. Williams was down a set and with Davenport having two match points in the 8th game of the second. Williams came back and won the last two sets in the 12th game of each. Williams's run was ended by Arantxa Sánchez Vicario in the semifinals when Williams fell, winning only 2 games in each set.

Australian Open
Williams then competed in her first slam at the Australian Open. In her first match, she faced Romanian Irina Spîrlea. Spîrlea won the first set in a tie-breaker, however Williams came back to take the next two sets with relative ease dropping just four games. In the following round, Williams faced older sister Venus Williams. The first set went to a tie-break, which Venus won and from then on carried the momentum to win the second set only dropping one game.

Williams paired with sister Venus Williams and moved through the third round with straight set victory over Erika deLone and Liezel Horn, and a three set come from behind victory over Rika Hiraki and Mercedes Paz. However, they fell in straights to the Japanese duo of Naoko Kijimuta and Nana Smith

Williams also played Mixed doubles and partnered local Lleyton Hewitt, however they faltered in the first round in straight sets to Natasha Zvereva and Andrew Florent.

IGA Tennis Classic
Williams headed to the United States in Oklahoma in the IGA Tennis Classic. In the first round she faced compatriot Katrina Adams and won in straight sets in just 44 minutes, breaking Adams twice in both sets. She then faced Australian Annabel Ellwood in the following round and cruised through with a straight set victory. In the quarterfinals, she faced Joannette Kruger and fell in lop-sided loss winning only two games in the match, one in each set.

In the doubles, she and sister Venus Williams cruised through their first title as a team without dropping a set defeating the teams of Surina De Beer and Lindsay Lee-Waters, Katrina Adams and Debbie Graham, Laura Golarsa and Liezel Horn, and Cătălina Cristea and Kristine Kunce in the final.

State Farm Evert Cup and Lipton Championships
Williams then stayed in the USA, playing at the Lipton Championships. Williams began her tournament against Denisa Chládková and won easily losing four games including a bagel in the second set. In the next round she faced Irina Spîrlea, the world no. 10. The first set went to a tie-break, which Williams won, Williams then stormed through the second set with a bagel. Williams then had an easier match in the Round of 32, defeating Barbara Paulus in straight sets. In the fourth round, she faced Swiss no. 2 Patty Schnyder, Williams won the first set in a bagel, however her higher ranked opponent took the second set. Williams then took control of the final set taking it in the ninth game. In the final 8, Williams took on world no. 1 Martina Hingis and took the first set, however Hingis came back to push it to a decider. The decider went to a tie-breaker which Hingis took.

Williams chose to compete at the State Farm Evert Cup but only in doubles with sister Venus Williams they were able to get to the quarterfinals without dropping a set but fell to Martina Hingis and Mirjana Lučić in three sets. They also played at the Lipton Championships but fell in their first match to the team of Els Callens and Patricia Hy-Boulais

Campionati Internazionali d’Italia
Williams then played at the Campionati Internazionali d’Italia, in her first clay court tournament. Her first opponent was 11th seed Nathalie Tauziat, Williams came through in a tough first set, but won the second set with ease in a bagel scoreline to upset her seeded opponent. In her match, Williams advanced when her opponent South African Joannette Kruger retired with a back injury in the seventh game when Williams was leading by a double break. In the following round she faced 8th seed Conchita Martínez and won with ease in straight sets, losing two games in each. In the quarterfinals, she faced sister Venus Williams for the second time in the year and like their previous encounter Serena lost in straight sets.

In doubles, she played with sister Venus and they cruised through the first three rounds in straight sets defeating the teams of Naoko Kijimuta and Nana Smith, Virág Csurgó and Yuka Yoshida, and Katrina Adams and Manon Bollegraf. In the semifinals, they faced Virginia Ruano Pascual and Paola Suárez, the Williams sisters won the first set but lost the second and third.

French Open
Williams then played in the second slam of the year at the clay courts of Roland Garros. In her debut match, she faced Canadian Jana Nejedly and won in three sets, Williams came through despite losing the second set easily, winning only a game. In her next match, she faced compatriot Corina Morariu and won with ease dropping only a game. In the third round, Williams took on Dominique Monami and won in a double breadstick. In the round of 16, Williams faced world no. 5 Arantxa Sánchez Vicario, Williams was up by a set and was serving for the match in the ninth game, but eventually lost in three.

Williams also played mixed doubles with Argentinian Luis Lobo. Williams and Lobo won their first two matches against the teams of Helena Vildová and Pavel Vízner, and Larisa Savchenko and Leander Paes. In the third round they faced the American pairing of Ginger Helgeson-Nielsen and Jim Grabb, they split the first two sets, however Williams and Lobo dominated the third without dropping a game. They then had little difficulty putting out the pairings of Kristie Boogert and Donald Johnson, and Rachel McQuillan and David Macpherson to advance to the title match. In the final they faced sister Venus Williams and Justin Gimelstob. Serena and Lobo lead by a break by the fifth game in the first set just to lose the next five games. Venus and Gimelstob took the second set by the same scoreline.

Direct Line Insurance Championships
Williams then played her first grass tournament at the Direct Line Insurance Championships, she faced two Japanese players in her first two matches taking on Naoko Sawamatsu and Ai Sugiyama, she won both matches in straight sets. In the quarterfinals, she again faced Arantxa Sánchez Vicario for the second time in three weeks and once again lost in three sets after winning the first set.

Wimbledon Championships
Williams next event is the Wimbledon Championships, Williams's first round opponent is Laura Golarsa and won in two sets with a break lead in each. Williams then faced Mirjana Lučić in the next round and dominated losing only three games, including a bagel in the second set. In the third round, Williams faced Spaniard Virginia Ruano Pascual and was down by a set and just won a game after losing the first four in the first set, when she retired due to leg injury, however after the match, Williams said that she could have finished the match.

She and sister Venus were supposed to compete in doubles, but withdrew before their first round match against Naoko Kijimuta and Nana Smith.

Williams once again played in the Mixed Doubles, but this time partnering Belorussian Max Mirnyi. In their first match, they faced Cătălina Cristea and Geoff Grant winning by a breadstick and a tie-break. In their next matches, they were pushed to three sets, coming back from a set down against the teams of Lindsay Davenport and Brian MacPhie, and Nathalie Tauziat and Daniel Nestor. In the quarterfinals they faced the Australian team of Kristine Kunce and Sandon Stolle and won in three dropping the second set. In the following match they defeated the Dutch team of Caroline Vis and Paul Haarhuis and for the third time came back from a set down. In the final they faced Mirjana Lučić and Mahesh Bhupathi and won in straight sets, losing four games in both sets. This win gave both Williams and Mirnyi their first slam title.

Toshiba TennisClassic
Williams then came to the States and competed at the Toshiba TennisClassic. In the first round she faced Larisa Neiland and demolished the Latvian with a double bagel in just 38 minutes and losing only 19 points. In the second round she faced Sandrine Testud and won three dropping the second set. In the final 8, she took on world no. 1 Martina Hingis and fell quite convincingly, winning just five games to the top player.

US Open
Williams then competed in the final slam of the year at the US Open. In her first match, Williams had to scrapped through Australian Nicole Pratt, when she dropped the second set, but finally came through in three. However, her next match was easier taking on Kiwi's Pavlina Nola, Williams just dropped three games to advance. In the third round, she faced Irina Spîrlea, Williams had won their two previous matches in the year, however Spîrlea took the first set just to see Williams come back in the second winning it in a bagel. In the final set, Williams was broken in the 11th game and Spîrlea took advantage and closed it out in the next game to eliminate Williams.

For the second slam in a row, Williams played mixed doubles with Max Mirnyi. In their first two matches, they came through easily defeating Miriam Oremans and Nicklas Kulti in straight sets and having a walkover over Americans Lindsay Davenport and Jan-Michael Gambill. In a repeat of the Wimbledon mixed doubles final, they faced Mirjana Lučić and Mahesh Bhupathi, Williams and Mirnyi dropped the first set, but took the final two sets at five. In the semifinals, they had to battle hard against Debbie Graham and Sandon Stolle, as both teams traded the first two sets both going to a tie-break. In the final set Williams and Mirnyi took it with ease to advance. In the final they faced the American team of Lisa Raymond and Patrick Galbraith. The American-Belorussian team came through in two easy sets over the American team to claim their second straight slam as a team.

Porsche Tennis Grand Prix
In her final tournament in singles in the year, Williams played at the Porsche Tennis Grand Prix. In her opening match she took on Květa Hrdličková, and was pushed in three set, but came through winning the final set with a bagel. In the second round, she faced  another Czech third seed Jana Novotná, the pair split the first two sets, however Novotná being down a break retired after twisting her back. Williams then fell to France's Sandrine Testud despite coming back to take the second set.

In the doubles, she paired with sister Venus Williams but fell in the first round to Lisa Raymond and Rennae Stubbs, losing in a tie-break and a breadstick.

European Championships and MGTS Kremlin Cup
Williams chose to play only in the doubles of the European Championships pairing with sister Venus Williams, they faced top seeds Lindsay Davenport and Natasha Zvereva, they produced an upset in straight sets. They then came through coming back from a set down against Amanda Coetzer and Anna Kournikova. In the semifinals they defeated Manon Bollegraf and Debbie Graham in a tough first set but came through easily in the second. In the final, they came back from a set down against Mariaan De Swardt and Elena Tatarkova, to claim their second title as a team and their biggest title so far.

The pair also chose to compete at the MGTS Kremlin Cup and came through their tough first match against Elena Likhovtseva and Ai Sugiyama, winning it in a tie-break in the third set. However, they withdrew prior to their quarterfinal match against Anna Kournikova and Monica Seles.

All matches

Singles matches

Doubles matches

Mixed Doubles matches

Tournament schedule

Singles schedule
Williams's 1995-1998 singles tournament schedule is as follows:

Doubles schedule

Williams's 1997-1998 doubles tournament schedule is as follows:

Mixed Doubles schedule

Williams's 1998 doubles tournament schedule is as follows:

Yearly records

Head-to-head matchups

1995
 Annie Miller 0-1

1997

 Amanda Basica 1-0
 Tamarine Tanasugarn 1-0
 Gloria Pizzichini 1-0
 Anastasia Myskina 1-0
 Åsa Svensson 1-0
 Elena Likhovtseva 1-0
 Mary Pierce 1-0
 Monica Seles 1-0
 Magui Serna 1-1
 Kimberly Po 0-1
 Dominique Monami 0-1
 Lindsay Davenport 0-1
 Alexia Dechaume-Balleret 0-1

1998

 Corina Morariu 2-0
 Laura Golarsa 2-0
 Mirjana Lučić 2-0
 Corina Morariu 2-0
 Gloria Pizzichini 1-0
 Lindsay Davenport 1-0
 Katrina Adams 1-0
 Annabel Ellwood 1-0
 Denisa Chládková 1-0
 Barbara Paulus 1-0
 Patty Schnyder 1-0
 Nathalie Tauziat 1-0
 Conchita Martínez 1-0
 Jana Nejedly 1-0
 Dominique Monami 1-0
 Naoko Sawamatsu 1-0
 Ai Sugiyama 1-0
 Larisa Neiland 1-0
 Nicole Pratt 1-0
 Pavlina Nola 1-0
 Květa Hrdličková 1-0
 Jana Novotná 1-0
 Irina Spîrlea 2-1
 Sandrine Testud 2-1
 Sandrine Testud 1-1
 Joannette Kruger 1-1
 Virginia Ruano Pascual 0-1
 Venus Williams 0-2
 Martina Hingis 0-2
 Arantxa Sánchez Vicario 0-3

Finals

Doubles: 2 (2–0)

Mixed doubles: (2–1)

See also

 1995 WTA Tour
 1997 WTA Tour
 1998 WTA Tour

References

External links

Serena Williams's early career
Early careers by sportspeople